The Institute of Economics (Russian: Институ́т эконо́мики), is a research institution within the Russian Academy of Sciences. Since 2011, the official name of the institution has been the Federal State Budgetary Institution of Economics of the Russian Academy of Sciences (Russian: Федеральное государственное бюджетное учреждение науки Институт экономики Российской академии наук).

History 
The Institute of Economics was originally established in 1922 under the Communist Academy.

On July 8, 1930, the Institute of Economics of the Russian Association of Scientific Research Institutes of Social Sciences (RANION) was merged the Institute of Economics of the Communist Academy.

On August 10, 1931, the Institute of Economics of the Communist Academy was merged with the Economic Institute of Red Professors.

On February 15, 1936, the Economic and Agrarian Institutes of the Communist Academy were reorganized into a single Institute of Economics, with its inclusion in the system of the Academy of Sciences of the Soviet Union.

On October 4, 1947, the Institute of World Economy and World Politics and the Institute of Economics were merged into the Institute of Economics in the system of the Academy of Sciences of the Soviet Union.

In 2005, the Institute of Economics and the Institute of International Economic and Political Research (IMEPS RAS, formerly the Institute of Economics of the World Socialist System of the Academy of Sciences of the USSR) were merged, the latter entered the structure of the Institute of Economics as a branch called the Department of International Economic and Political Research (OMEPI).

Structure 
The Institute includes these research centers:

 Center for Political and Economic Research;
 Center for Investment and Innovation; Center for Macroeconomic Strategy;
 Center for Labor Market and Social Processes Research; Center for Social and Economic Problems of Federalism; * Center for Institutional and Microeconomic Research;
 Center for Financial and Banking Research; Information center.

The structure of OMEPI includes the Center for Foreign Economic Research.

The Institute publishes the journal Economic Questions.

Directors

References

External links 
 Official website 

Institutes of the Russian Academy of Sciences
Educational institutions established in 1930
1930 establishments in Russia
1930 establishments in the Soviet Union
Research institutes in Russia
Economic research institutes